Last Days of Eden is a Spanish symphonic power metal band from Asturias. It was founded in 2013 with members from the power metal band DarkSun. Their music mixes elements from symphonic metal with celtic music using the sound of bagpipes, whistles and flutes, making their sound quite similar to the recent albums of Nightwish.

Members 
 Lady Ani – female vocals
 Dani G. – guitars and male vocals
 Javy González – bass
 Leo Duarte – drums
 Sara Ember – violin
 Andrea Joglar – bagpipes, whistles and flutes

Past members 
 Jorge Ruiz – bass
 Manuel Morán – drums
 Alberto Ardines – drums
 Chris Bada – drums
 Gustavo Rodríguez – bagpipes
 Pindy Díaz – bagpipes, whistles and flutes
Juan Gomes – keyboards
Adrián Huelga – bass

Discography

EP 
 Paradise – 2014

Albums 
 Ride The World – 2015
 Traxel Mör – 2017
 Chrysalis – 2018
 Butterflies – 2021

Singles/music videos 
 Paradise – 2014
 Invincible – 2015
 Here Come the Wolves (lyric video) – 2015
 The Piper's Call – 2016
 Ride the World (road movie) – 2016
"The Garden" (2021)
"Silence" (2021)
"The Secret" (2021)
"Save The World" (2021)
"Lluz de Llucerín" (2021)

See also 
 DarkSun

References

External links 
 Last Days of Eden on Facebook
 Last Days of Eden on YouTube

Spanish power metal musical groups
Musical groups established in 2013
Asturian music
Spanish symphonic metal musical groups
2013 establishments in Spain
Celtic metal musical groups
Folk metal musical groups